Phileurus truncatus, Triceratops Beetle, is a species of beetle of the family Scarabaeidae.

Description
Body length, 32-38 millimeters. Both adult males and females have large and distinct horns on the head.

Distribution
Virginia, south to Florida, west to Tennessee and southeastern Arizona.

References

Dynastinae
Beetles described in 1806